Amanatullah Khan  is an Indian politician and is member of the Delhi Legislative Assembly. He is a member of the Aam Aadmi Party and represents Okhla (Assembly constituency) of Delhi in the Sixth Legislative Assembly of Delhi. Khan is the elected chairman of the Delhi Waqf Board since November 2020.

Early life
Amanatullah Khan was born in Agwanpur village, Meerut district to Waliullah Khan. He attended the Jamia Millia Islamia but did not complete his degree. He is educated till twelfth grade, which he passed in 1992–93. He is married to Shafia Khan and has a son and a daughter.

Political career
Khan had unsuccessfully contested in the 2008 Delhi Legislative Assembly election and 2013 Delhi Legislative Assembly election as a Lok Jan Shakti Party candidate. In 2013 he got 3600 votes and ended on sixth position.

Since 2015 Amanatullah Khan is a member of the Aam Aadmi Party.

Member of Legislative Assembly (2015 - 2020) 
In 2015 he contested elections for the Legislative Assembly of Delhi and won, becoming a member of the Sixth Legislative Assembly of Delhi.

On 20 July 2016, a woman alleged that Khan's supporters threatened her after her complaint about electricity supply. She then filed a case against Khan for allegedly threatening her at the Jamia Nagar Police station in South Delhi. On 23 July Khan held a press conference and said that the woman was "pressurised" by the police to give a false statement against him. When the incident was reported, Khan said he was out of the town in Meerut on July 9 and 10, and his children were in Kashmir on a holiday. Next day on 24 July 2016  Delhi Police arrested Khan and sent him to custody. On 28 July 2016 Khan got bail from the court as he was not required for the investigation. The Aam Aadmi Party released a video footage and a transcript of a conversation involving the complainant woman saying that, "the SHO of Jamia Nagar police station asked her to add allegations of threats — on raping and killing her — in the FIR". AAP said that other AAP MLAs were also similarly targeted like Khan in false cases by Delhi Police.

On 18 April 2017, Khan said that members of the Indian National Congress had fired guns at him in the presence of police, when members of the Congress and Aam Aami Party clashed with each other in the Jamia Nagar area ahead of local municipal elections. On 28 January 2018, two members of Congress filed assault case against Khan.

On 20 February 2018, an assault case was filed by Delhi Chief Secretary Anshu Prakash against Khan and fellow legislator Prakash Jarwal for allegedly slapping and abusing him. In 2021, a Delhi court dismissed the assault case filed by the Delhi bureaucrat against Kejriwal and ten AAP MLAs and discharged them of all charges. The court noted that "no prima facie case" was made against them.

Member of Legislative Assembly (2020 onwards) 
In 2020 he defeated Braham Singh of BJP by a margin of 71,664 votes in the 2020 Delhi Legislative Assembly elections.  Since 2020, he is an elected member of the 7th Delhi Assembly.
His term as MLA in the Seventh Legislative Assembly of Delhi is his second term.

In April 2020, a video of man assaulting a 14 year old child at Dasna temple in UP had gone viral. A far right Hindu Yati Narsinghand Saraswati released a video supporting the assaulter and also made disparaging comments against Prophet Muhammad. Khan filed a police complaint at Jamia Nagar police station against Saraswati for "hurting religious sentiments". He said, "There are uncouth words that are below the standards of being repeated. It is needless to say that such statements for cheap publicity and personal gain hurts sentiments of Muslims at large. Yati Narsinghanand Saraswati with all his knowledge and intention has hurt religious sentiments of the Muslim community not only in India, but all the over the world." Khan had posted a reaction video where he was seen calling for Narsinghand's beheading and cutting off his tongue, followed by a statement that even though his words call for beheading, "we have faith in the Constitution and the law and we hope an FIR will be registered against him and he will be sent to jail". Later a police complaint was filed against Khan for allegedly threatening Narsinghand.

Khan had publicly criticized the Bharatiya Janata Party led Union government. In May 2022, the BJP led Municipal body in Delhi had organized a drive where structures were destroyed with bulldozers (backhoe). Khan led protests against the demolition drive and was arrested for the same. He was released on bail next day.

Committee assignments of Delhi Legislative Assembly
 Chairman (2020-2022), Committee on Welfare of Minorities
 Member (2020-2022), General Purposes Committee
 Member (2020-2022), Committee on the issues related to Unauthorised Colonies
 Member (2020-2023), Committee on Government Undertakings
 Member (2022-2023), Library Committee
 Member (2022-2023), Committee on Ethics
 Member (2022-2023), Committee on Welfare of Minorities
 Member (2022-2023), House Committee on Violation of Protocol Norms and Contemptuous Behaviour By Government Officers with MLAs - (Elected by the House)

Criminal History 
Amanatullah Khan is known for his mischievous acts. Police declared him history-sheeter in March 2022. 18 First Information Reports (FIRs) have been leveled against him till March 2022. In May he was arrested for protesting against the anti-encroachment drive. He also considered as a habitual criminal as he was involved in land-grabbing and hurt offenses. He also failed to deter from criminal activities despite the prosecutions made against him.

On 16 September 2022, he was arrested again in a corruption case. On 26 September he was sent to Judicial custody and released on bail on 28 September 2022.

Electoral performance

References 

Living people
People from New Delhi
Date of birth missing (living people)
Delhi MLAs 2015–2020
Delhi MLAs 2020–2025
1974 births
Aam Aadmi Party MLAs from Delhi
People involved in the Citizenship Amendment Act protests